Chuchelna is a municipality and village in Semily District in the Liberec Region of the Czech Republic. It has about 1,000 inhabitants.

Administrative parts
Villages of Komárov and Lhota are administrative parts of Chuchelna.

References

Villages in Semily District